The medial superior genicular, a branch of the popliteal artery, runs in front of the Semimembranosus and Semitendinosus, above the medial head of the Gastrocnemius, and passes beneath the tendon of the Adductor magnus.

It divides into two branches, one of which supplies the vastus medialis, anastomosing with the highest genicular and medial inferior genicular arteries; the other ramifies close to the surface of the femur, supplying it and the knee-joint, and anastomosing with the lateral superior genicular artery.

The medial superior genicular artery is frequently of small size, a condition, which is associated with an increase in the size of the highest genicular.

See also
 Patellar anastomosis

References 

Arteries of the lower limb